The 2016 Clemson Tigers men's soccer team represents Clemson University during the 2016 NCAA Division I men's soccer season.  The Tigers are led by head coach Mike Noonan, in his seventh season.  They play home games at Riggs Field.  This is team's 56th season playing organized men's college soccer and their 29th playing in the Atlantic Coast Conference.

Roster

Updated 08/04/16

Draft picks
The Tigers had one player drafted in the 2017 MLS SuperDraft.

Coaching staff

Source:

Schedule

|-
!colspan=6 style=""| Exhibition

|-
!colspan=6 style=""| Regular season

|-
!colspan=6 style=""| ACC Tournament

|-
!colspan=6 style=""| NCAA Tournament

Rankings

References

Clemson
Clemson Tigers men's soccer seasons
Clemson men's soccer
Clemson